The 2014–15 Middle Tennessee Blue Raiders women's basketball team represented Middle Tennessee State University during the 2014–15 NCAA Division I women's basketball season. The Blue Raiders, led by 10th year head coach Rick Insell, play their home games at the Murphy Center and were second year members of Conference USA. They finished the season 24–10, 14–4 in C-USA play to finish in second place. They advanced to the semifinals of the C-USA women's tournament where they lost to Southern Miss. They were invited to the Women's National Invitation Tournament where they defeated Ball State in the first round, Arkansas State in the second round and Ole Miss in the third round before falling to Temple in the quarterfinals.

Roster

Rankings

Schedule

|-
! colspan="9" style="background:#00407a; color:#fff;"| Exhibition

|-
! colspan="9" style="background:#00407a; color:#fff;"| Regular season

|-
! colspan="9" style="background:#00407a; color:#fff;"| Conference USA Tournament

|-
! colspan="9" style="background:#00407a; color:#fff;"| WNIT

See also
 2014–15 Middle Tennessee Blue Raiders men's basketball team

References

Middle Tennessee Blue Raiders women's basketball seasons
Middle Tennessee
2015 Women's National Invitation Tournament participants
Middle Tennessee Blue Raiders
Middle Tennessee Blue Raiders